Bhesa ceylanica is a species of plant in the family Centroplacaceae. It is endemic to Sri Lanka.

References

Endemic flora of Sri Lanka
ceylanica
Vulnerable plants
Taxonomy articles created by Polbot